Relentless Studios (formerly Amazon Game Studios Seattle) is an American video game developer that is based in Seattle, Washington. The company is led by Louis Castle, most known for being the co-founder of development Westwood Studios. The studio is one of four game main development divisions under Amazon Games. The other three are based in San Diego, California, Orange County, California, and Montreal, Quebec. The studio is most known for releasing the PC title Crucible in May 2020. The game would remain in active service until it was closed in November of the same year.

Games

References

Video game development companies
Video game companies of the United States
Companies based in Seattle